Elmer Jacob Schnackenberg (August 22, 1889 – September 15, 1968) was a United States circuit judge of the United States Court of Appeals for the Seventh Circuit.

Education and career

Born in Indianapolis, Indiana, Schnackenberg received a Bachelor of Laws from the University of Chicago Law School in 1912. He was in private practice in Chicago, Illinois from 1912 to 1945. He was a member of the Illinois House of Representatives from 1913 to 1915 and again from 1923 to 1945. In 1912, Schnackenberg was elected to the Illinois House of Representatives as one of three representatives from the 13th district alongside Republican incumbent Benton Kleeman and Socialist candidate Seymour Stedman. He served a single term. He was Speaker of the Illinois House of Representatives from 1941 to 1945. He was general attorney for the South Park Commissioners in Chicago from 1925 to 1930. He was a Judge on the Circuit Court of Cook County, Illinois from 1945 to 1954.

Federal judicial service

Schnackenberg received a recess appointment from President Dwight D. Eisenhower on November 17, 1953, to a seat on the United States Court of Appeals for the Seventh Circuit vacated by Judge Otto Kerner Sr. He was formally nominated to the same seat by President Eisenhower on January 11, 1954. He was confirmed by the United States Senate on February 9, 1954, and received his commission the same day. His service was terminated on September 15, 1968, due to his death.

References

Sources
 

1889 births
1968 deaths
Lawyers from Chicago
Politicians from Indianapolis
University of Chicago Law School alumni
Members of the Illinois House of Representatives
Speakers of the Illinois House of Representatives
Illinois state court judges
Judges of the United States Court of Appeals for the Seventh Circuit
United States court of appeals judges appointed by Dwight D. Eisenhower
20th-century American judges
Illinois Progressives (1912)